Cercoseptoria ocellata is a fungal plant pathogen that affects the tea plant (Camellia sinensis).

External links 
 Index Fungorum
 USDA ARS Fungal Database

References 

Fungal plant pathogens and diseases
Tea diseases
Mycosphaerellaceae
Fungi described in 1983